Peter Fettes was a BBC Radio presenter, active in the 1940s and 1950s. He subsequently became a BBC head of staff training.

He appeared as a castaway on the BBC Radio programme Desert Island Discs on 11 August 1945.

References 

He was born in Penang Malaysia, son of Colonel James Dollery Fettes and Margaret Hood Moffat Johnstone. At the age of 7 he was sent back alone to England to school whilst his father was building the Guillemard Reservoir which brought water from the hill to the city of Penang.

Year of birth missing
Year of death missing
BBC radio presenters